The Boston mayoral election of 1858 saw the reelection of Frederic W. Lincoln Jr.

Although nominated by both the People's Union  and National American parties, former mayor Jerome V. C. Smith declined to run.

Results

See also
List of mayors of Boston, Massachusetts

References

Mayoral elections in Boston
Boston
Boston mayoral
19th century in Boston